The 2014 Open Sud de France was a tennis tournament played on indoor hard courts. It was the 27th edition of the Open Sud de France, and part of the ATP World Tour 250 Series of the 2014 ATP World Tour. It took place at the Arena Montpellier in Montpellier, France, from February 3 to February 9, 2014.

Points and prize money

Point distribution

Prize money 

* per team

Singles main draw entrants

Seeds 

 Rankings are as of January 27, 2014.

Other entrants 
The following players received wildcards into the singles main draw:
  Pierre-Hugues Herbert
  Paul-Henri Mathieu
  Gilles Simon

The following players received entry from the qualifying draw:
  Andrés Artuñedo Martínavarr
  Marc Gicquel
  Marsel İlhan
  Albano Olivetti

The following player received entry as a lucky loser:
  Vincent Millot

Withdrawals
Before the tournament
  Roberto Bautista-Agut (right wrist injury)
  Benoît Paire (left patellar tendon injury)
  Stanislas Wawrinka (leg injury)

Retirements
  Nicolas Mahut (flu)
  Oleksandr Nedovyesov (right shoulder injury)

Doubles main draw entrants

Seeds 

 Rankings are as of January 27, 2014.

Other entrants 
The following pairs received wildcards into the doubles main draw:
  Dorian Descloix /  Gaël Monfils
  Guillaume Rufin /  Gilles Simon

Withdrawals 
Before the tournament
  Gaël Monfils (back injury)

Finals

Singles 

 Gaël Monfils defeated  Richard Gasquet, 6–4, 6–4

Doubles 

 Nikolay Davydenko /  Denis Istomin defeated  Marc Gicquel /  Nicolas Mahut, 6–4, 1–6, [10–7]

References

External links